Jonas Vailokaitis (1886-1944) was a Lithuanian politician, banker, and industrialist, and one of the twenty signatories to the Act of Independence of Lithuania.

Born near Šakiai, he was educated at the Institute of Commerce and Industry in St. Petersburg. Together with his brother he established a bank in Kaunas in 1912. They pursued a policy of buying estates from bankrupt owners, subdividing them, and then selling the land to smaller-scale Lithuanian farmers; this was credited with placing these lands out of the reach of Russian colonists. He served in the Vilnius Conference in 1917 and was elected to the Council of Lithuania, signing the act of independence in 1918.

In 1920 Vailokaitis was elected to the Constituent Assembly on the Christian Democratic Party ticket; he served as chairman of the budget and finance commissions. His commercial pursuits included the founding of Ūkio Bankas (The Economy Bank), the joint stock company Metalas, and several import-export companies.

During the Soviet occupation of Lithuania in 1940, he moved to Germany, where he died in 1944.

References
"Vailokaitis, Jonas". Encyclopedia Lituanica VI: 23. (1970-1978). Ed. Simas Sužiedėlis. Boston, Massachusetts: Juozas Kapočius. LCCN 74-114275.

1886 births
1944 deaths
People from Šakiai District Municipality
People from Suwałki Governorate
Members of the Council of Lithuania
Lithuanian independence activists
Lithuanian bankers